Varian Semiconductor Equipment Associates, Inc. was a supplier of ion implantation equipment used in the fabrication of semiconductor chips. Varian Semiconductor was founded in 1971 as Extrion Corporation in Peabody, Massachusetts. Extrion later moved to nearby Gloucester, Massachusetts and was bought by Varian Associates in 1975. It was spun off from Varian Associates in 1999.

Applied Materials announced its acquisition of Varian Semiconductor in May 2011.

References

External links
Varian Semiconductor
Stock Profile of Varian Semiconductor

Electronics companies established in 1971
Companies formerly listed on the Nasdaq
Companies based in Gloucester, Massachusetts
Equipment semiconductor companies
Electronics companies disestablished in 2011
2011 disestablishments in Massachusetts
2011 mergers and acquisitions